Baltimore Lab School is a nonpublic school for bright children in grades 1–12.  Baltimore Lab School provides a unique educational opportunity for students with moderate-to-severe learning differences.  Baltimore Lab School is located in Baltimore, Maryland in Goucher Hall (one of the historic Old Goucher College Buildings) built by renowned architect Stanford White. The school was founded in September 2000 as a division of its parent school in Washington D.C., The Lab School of Washington. Both schools were founded and administered by Sally Smith, a nationally recognized leader in special education, until her death in 2007.

Baltimore Lab School offers its students and the public clinical services, including speech-language therapy, occupational therapy and psychological services. Individual or small group related service sessions are offered on an outpatient basis or through pull-out or push-in services for an extra fee. All students are able to benefit from these on-site specialists through services integrated into instruction.

Baltimore Lab is a training site for interns from Temple University, Johns Hopkins University, Loyola University, Towson University, Goucher College, and Maryland Institute College of Art.  These students complete an internship under the supervision of Baltimore Lab's teaching staff.  Baltimore Lab School faculty members are invited to speak at local universities and professional conferences.

Baltimore Lab School offers a low student-to-staff ratio.

The school also offers after-school activities and sports, such as cross country, indoor rock-climbing, tennis, track and field, basketball, and swimming, as well as many field trips to further enhance the learning experience of students. Baltimore Lab School also partners with the Chesapeake Bay Foundation to organize a multitude of outdoor learning experiences for students of all ages.

Baltimore Lab School's 9th commencement exercises took place in June 2016. The commencement speaker was James Piper Bond, President of Living Classrooms Foundation.  Previous commencement speakers have included Fred Lazarus, who at the time was President of Maryland Institute College of Art.

In March 2014, Baltimore Lab School began operating fully independently from Lab School of Washington. The building that houses the school was purchased from Washington Lab.

References

External links 
Official Baltimore Lab School Website

 
Old pictures of Goucher Hall
Lab School of Washington Website
Official Academy in Manayunk Website
Official Gateway Lab School Website

Private schools in Baltimore
Special schools in the United States